Chestnut Street may refer to:

 Chestnut Street, Kent, England
 Chestnut Street Bridge, bridge across the Schuylkill River in Philadelphia, Pennsylvania
 Chestnut Street (Philadelphia), a street in Philadelphia, Pennsylvania
 Chestnut Street (St. Louis), a street in St. Louis, Missouri
 Chestnut Street (San Francisco), a street in San Francisco, California
 Chestnut Street Incident, the debut album for Johnny Cougar
 Chestnut Street (Carlin, Nevada), former US 40
 Chestnut Street District, an historic district in Salem, Massachusetts
 Chestnut Street (Bridgeville), Pennsylvania
 Chestnut Street (BMT Fulton Street Line), a station on the demolished BMT Fulton Street Line
 Chestnut Street Methodist Church (Louisville, Kentucky)

Fiction
 Chestnut Street (book), a 2014 short story collection by Maeve Binchy

See also 
 Chestnut (disambiguation)